The Çığlıkara Nature Reserve is a forest of mostly Lebanon cedar (Cedrus libani) in Antalya Province, southern Turkey. It is a registered nature reserve of the country.

It is located in Elmalı district of Antalya Province. It is home to nearly 400 plant species, among them endemic flora and seven as natural monument registered old trees. The forest was registered a nature reserve on July 5, 1991.

Trees of natural monument
 Koca Katran Lübnan sediri, Big old cedar of Lebanon (Cedrus libani)

References 

Nature reserves in Turkey
Forests of Turkey
Antalya Province
Elmalı District
Protected areas established in 1991
1991 establishments in Turkey
Important Bird Areas of Turkey